Susan Davis Wigenton (born October 12, 1962) is a United States district judge of the United States District Court for the District of New Jersey.

Early life and education
Born in Neptune Township, New Jersey, Wigenton grew up with three brothers in a sports-oriented family headed by her pastor father. She graduated from Norfolk State University with her Bachelor of Arts degree in 1984 and later from The College of William & Mary Law School with a Juris Doctor in 1987.

Career
Wigenton was a law clerk for Superior Court Judge Lawrence Lawson in the New Jersey Superior Court from 1987 to 1988 before serving in private practice in the State of New Jersey from 1988 to 2000.

Federal judicial service
Wigenton was a United States magistrate judge of the United States District Court for the District of New Jersey from 2000 to 2006. She was nominated to be a United States District Judge of the United States District Court for the District of New Jersey by President George W. Bush on January 25, 2006, to a seat vacated by Judge John Winslow Bissell, who assumed senior status. Wigenton was confirmed by the Senate on May 26, 2006 by a  voice vote. She received her commission on June 12, 2006.

Notable cases
Wigenton presided over the trial of Andrew Auernheimer for alleged cybercrimes. The trial resulted in Auernheimer's conviction on two counts, but on April 11, 2014, the United States Court of Appeals for the Third Circuit reversed the conviction for improper venue under the Sixth Amendment, holding that the online conduct of Auernheimer, a resident of Arkansas, did not have a sufficient nexus to New Jersey, where the trial was held.

Wigenton was the presiding judge for the trial concerning the Fort Lee lane closure scandal known as Bridgegate.

Personal life
Wigenton is married to Kevin Wigenton, an attorney in private practice in Red Bank, New Jersey.

See also 
 List of African-American federal judges
 List of African-American jurists
 List of people involved in the Fort Lee lane closure scandal

References

Sources

1962 births
Living people
Norfolk State University alumni
William & Mary Law School alumni
African-American judges
Judges of the United States District Court for the District of New Jersey
United States district court judges appointed by George W. Bush
21st-century American judges
United States magistrate judges
21st-century American women judges